
Białystok County is a unit of territorial administration and local government (powiat) in Podlaskie Voivodeship, north-eastern Poland, on the border with Belarus. It was created on 1 January 1999 as a result of the Polish local government reforms passed in 1998. Its administrative seat is the city of Białystok, although the city is not part of the county (it constitutes a separate city county).

As of 2019 its total population is 148,745, out of which the population of Łapy is 15,609, that of Czarna Białostocka is 9,318, that of Wasilków is 11,527, that of Choroszcz is 5,890, that of Supraśl is 4,605, that of Michałowo is 3,026, that of Zabłudów is 2,462, that of Tykocin is 1,973, that of Suraż is 988, and the rural population is 93,347.

Neighbouring counties
Apart from the city of Białystok, Białystok County is bordered by Hajnówka County and Bielsk County to the south, Wysokie Mazowieckie County, Zambrów County and Łomża County to the west, Mońki County to the north-west, and Sokółka County to the north-east. It also borders Belarus to the east.

Administrative division

The county is subdivided into 15 gminas (nine urban-rural and six rural). These are listed in the following table, in descending order of population.

Notable residents 

 Konstanty Kalinowski (known in Belarus as Kastuś Kalinoŭski)(1838, Mostowlany – 1864), writer, journalist, lawyer and revolutionary
 Aliaksei Karpiuk (1920, Straszewo – 1992), Belarusian writer and public figure

References

 
Land counties of Podlaskie Voivodeship